Carteria is a genus of green algae in the family Chlamydomonadaceae.  Carteria are distinguished from Chlamydomonas by having four, rather than two, flagella at the vegetative stage.

The genus name of Carteria is in honour of Henry John Carter, (1813–1895), who was a surgeon working in Bombay, India, who carried out work in geology, paleontology, and zoology.

The genus was circumscribed by Karl Moritz Diesing in Sitzungsber. Kaiserl. Akad. Wiss., Wien, Math.-Nat. Cl., Abt.
Vol.1 Issue 52 on page 356 in 1866.

References

External links

Chlamydomonadales genera
Chlamydomonadaceae